The IMP-16, by National Semiconductor, was the first multi-chip 16-bit microprocessor, released in 1973.  It consisted of five PMOS integrated circuits: four identical RALU chips, short for register and ALU, providing the data path, and one CROM, Control and ROM, providing control sequencing and microcode storage. The IMP-16 is a bit-slice processor; each RALU chip provides a 4-bit slice of the register and arithmetic that work in parallel to produce a 16-bit word length.

Each RALU chip stores its own 4 bits of the program counter, several registers, the ALU, a 16-word LIFO stack, and status flags. There were four 16-bit accumulators, two of which could be used as index registers. The instruction set architecture was similar to that of the Data General Nova. The chip set could be extended with the CROM chip (IMP-16A / 522D) that implemented 16-bit multiply and divide routines. The chipset was driven by a two-phase 715 kHz non-overlapping clock that had a +5 to -12 voltage swing.  An integral part of the architecture was a 16-bit input mux that provided various condition bits from the ALUs such as zero, carry, overflow along with general purpose inputs.

The microprocessor was used in the IMP-16P microcomputer and Jacquard Systems' J100 but saw little other use. The IMP-16 was later superseded by the PACE and INS8900 single-chip 16-bit microprocessors, which had a similar architecture but were not binary compatible.

References

External links
 IMP-16C board at the Selectric Typewriter Museum

IMP-16
16-bit microprocessors
Computers using bit-slice designs